This article provides an outline of the telecommunications infrastructure in San Marino.

Telephone

Landline telephone providers 
 San Marino Telecom (SMT)
 Telenet
 TIM San Marino (TIM)

Mobile network operators 
 San Marino Telecom (SMT)
 Telefonia Mobile Sammarinese (TMS)
 TIM San Marino
Note: In addition the four Italian mobile network operators Iliad, TIM, Vodafone and Wind Tre can be received in San Marino.

Television and radio 
San Marino has only one television network, San Marino RTV, which is owned by a company with the same name. In 1997, there were approximately 9,000 television sets in the country.

San Marino has two radio networks, Radio San Marino and Radio San Marino Classic, also owned by San Marino RTV. In 1997, there were approximately 16,000 radios in San Marino.

Internet 

In 2010 there were 17,000 Internet users in San Marino. San Marino's internet domain is .sm.

References